Bicilia iarchasalis is a moth in the family Crambidae. It was described by Francis Walker in 1859. It is found in the south-eastern United States, where it has been recorded from Florida and Texas, as well as in Mexico, Cuba, the Dominican Republic, Puerto Rico and Venezuela.

Adults are on wing from March to May and from August to September.

The larvae feed on Rivina humilis.

References

Moths described in 1859
Spilomelinae